United Nations Security Council Resolution 107 was a Security Council resolution adopted unanimously on March 30, 1955, calling upon the Egyptian and Israeli governments to cooperate with the proposals outlined in a report previously issued by the chief of staff of the United Nations Truce Supervision Organization in Palestine.

See also
 List of United Nations Security Council Resolutions 101 to 200 (1953–1965)
 United Nations Security Council Resolution 106

References
Text of the Resolution at undocs.org

External links
 

 0107
 0107

1955 in Egypt
 0107
1955 in Israel
March 1955 events